Maya Bigha is a small village located in Jehanabad district of Bihar state, India. The current population of this village is 1052, and the literacy rate is 84%.
Mukhiya of this village is "Asha Devi" from Kurre village. The village is part and part of Kurre Panchayat
MLA is Ram Bali Singh Yadav from CPIL party whereas the MP is Chandeshwar Prasad from Janta Dal United.

Maya Bigha is a small village in the state of Bihar in Eastern India.  It is approximately 15 km west of Islampur town and also 10 km south from Ghoshi town.  Barabar hills, which is a tourist destination is about 20 km south of this village. Barabar hills has historical importance and is a pilgrimage shrine for Hindus.  Bodhgaya is situated about 50 km south of this village and Rajgir is situated about 60 km east of this small village. 

There is a primary school in the village.

References

Villages in Jehanabad district